
Gmina Żółkiewka is a rural gmina (administrative district) in Krasnystaw County, Lublin Voivodeship, in eastern Poland.

Villages
Gmina Żółkiewka contains the villages and settlements of Adamówka, Borówek, Borówek-Kolonia, Celin, Chłaniów, Chłaniów-Kolonia, Chłaniówek, Chruściechów, Dąbie, Gany, Huta, Koszarsko, Majdan Wierzchowiński, Makowiska, Markiewiczów, Olchowiec, Olchowiec-Kolonia, Poperczyn, Rożki, Rożki-Kolonia, Siniec, Średnia Wieś, Tokarówka, Wierzchowina, Władysławin, Wola Żółkiewska, Wólka, Zaburze, Żółkiew-Kolonia and Żółkiewka.

Neighbouring gminas
Gmina Żółkiewka is bordered by the gminas of Gorzków, Krzczonów, Rudnik, Rybczewice, Turobin and Wysokie.

References
Polish official population figures 2006

Zolkiewka
Krasnystaw County